The Critics' Choice Television Award for Best Actress in a Comedy Series is one of the award categories presented annually by the Critics' Choice Television Awards (BTJA) to recognize the work done by television actresses. It was introduced in 2011, when the event was first initiated. The winners are selected by a group of television critics that are part of the Broadcast Television Critics Association.

Winners and nominees

2010s

2020s

Multiple wins
2 wins
 Rachel Brosnahan (consecutive)
 Julia Louis-Dreyfus (consecutive)
 Jean Smart (consecutive)

Multiple nominations
6 nominations
 Julia Louis-Dreyfus

4 nominations
 Amy Poehler
 Constance Wu

3 nominations
 Christina Applegate
 Rachel Brosnahan
 Issa Rae

2 nominations
 Rachel Bloom
 Alison Brie
 Kaley Cuoco
 Zooey Deschanel
 Lena Dunham
 Renée Elise Goldsberry
 Sutton Foster
 Ilana Glazer
 Allison Janney
 Ellie Kemper
 Wendi McLendon-Covey
 Catherine O'Hara
 Martha Plimpton
 Gina Rodriguez
 Tracee Ellis Ross
 Amy Schumer
 Jean Smart
 Phoebe Waller-Bridge

See also
 TCA Award for Individual Achievement in Comedy
 Primetime Emmy Award for Outstanding Lead Actress in a Comedy Series
 Golden Globe Award for Best Actress – Television Series Musical or Comedy
 Screen Actors Guild Award for Outstanding Performance by a Female Actor in a Comedy Series

References

External links
 

Critics' Choice Television Awards
Television awards for Best Actress